The 2010 Kyiv Victory Day Parade was held on May 9, 2010, in Kyiv, honoring the 65th anniversary of the Soviet Union's victory in the Great Patriotic War (in 2015 Ukraine altered this day to Victory Day over Nazism in World War II). Military vehicles and soldiers dressed in Soviet Army uniforms marched on Khreschatyk Street and  through Maidan Nezalezhnosti. Inspecting the parade was the Chief of the General Staff of the Armed Forces General of the Army Ivan Svyda while the commander of the Ukrainian Ground Forces, Colonel General Henadii Vorobiov commanded the parade. The decree for holding the parade was signed on 23 March of that year. The President of Ukraine Viktor Yanukovych delivered a jubilee address in his position as Supreme Commander. 2,500 members of the Ukrainian Armed Forces as well as troops from Russia and Belarus (the former being represented by the 45th Guards Spetsnaz Brigade taking part in a joint contingent with the Ukrainian Hetman Bohdan Khmelnytsky Independent Presidential Guard Regiment) took part in the parade. 17 military bands took part in the parade under the command of the Chief of the Military Music Department of the General Staff of the Ukrainian Armed Forces, Major General Volodymyr Derkach.

Full order of march past 
 Historical Contingent
 First part
 Colors Party composed of the Flag of Ukraine and the Victory Banner
 Kyiv Presidential Honor Guard Battalion
 Historical colors
 Front Standard bearers
 Second part
 Vehicles of the Soviet Armed Forces (led by the Ukrainian-made T-34)
 Red Army Infantry
 Armoured Forces of the Red Army
 Soviet Air Forces
 Soviet Navy
 Partisans
 Red Army Female personnel
 Corps of Drums, Ivan Bohun Military High School
 Tri-Service Colour Guard
 Composite Russian-Ukrainian contingent
 Hetman Bohdan Khmelnytsky Independent Presidential Guard Regiment
 45th Guards Spetsnaz Brigade
 Military Academy of Belarus
 National Defense University
 95th Air Assault Brigade
 Military Institute of Telecommunications and Information Technologies 
 15th Transport Aviation Brigade
 Koroliov Military Institute (National Aviation University)
 Ivan Kozhedub National Air Force University
 36th Separate Marine Brigade of the Ukrainian Naval Infantry
 National Security Service Academy
 National Academy of Internal Affairs
 21st Brigade of the Internal Troops of Ukraine
 Kharkiv National Civil Defense University, State Emergency Service of Ukraine

Other jubilee parades 
The Kyiv parade was the center of the 65th anniversary celebrations, with 2,000 military personnel and about 100 units of military equipment were
brought to celebrate Victory Day with parades in other Ukrainian cities. 1,040 Russian troops took part in the parades in four Ukrainian cities: Sevastopol, Kerch, Odessa and Mykolaiv. In turn, 75 cadets from the Hetman Petro Sahaidachnyi National Ground Forces Academy participated in the Moscow Victory Day Parade on Red Square.

Gallery

See also 
2010 Moscow Victory Day Parade
2010 Minsk Victory Day Parade

References 

Military parades in Ukraine
2010s in Kyiv
2010 in Ukraine
Events in Kyiv
May 2010 events in Ukraine